Caeca et Obdurata Hebraeorum perfidia (named for its Latin incipit, meaning the blind and obdurate perfidy of the Hebrews) was a papal bull, promulgated by Pope Clement VIII on February 25, 1593, which expelled the Jews from the Papal States, effectively revoking the bull Christiana pietas (1586) of his predecessor Pope Sixtus V. Prior to 1586, Pope Pius V's bull Hebraeorum gens sola (1569) had restricted Jews in the Papal States to Rome and Ancona.

The bull was a culmination of Clement VIII's tightening of the anti-Jewish measures of his predecessors which began with his elevation to the papacy in 1592. The bull gave Jews three months to leave the Papal States (with the exception of Rome, Ancona, and the Comtat Venaissin of Avignon). The main effect of the bull was to evict Jews who had returned to areas of the Papal States (mainly Umbria) after 1586 (following their expulsion in 1569) and to expel Jewish communities from cities like Bologna (which had been incorporated under papal dominion since 1569).

For the Jews remaining within Rome, Ancona, or the Comtat Venaissin, the bull re-established mandatory weekly sermons. The bull also resulted in the relocation of Jewish cemeteries to Ferrara and Mantua. 

The bull alleged that Jews in the Papal States had engaged in usury and exploited the hospitality of Clement VIII's predecessors "who, in order to lead them from their darkness to knowledge of the true faith, deemed it opportune to use the clemency of Christian piety towards them" (alluding to Christiana pietas).

Three days later, on February 28, Clement VIII promulgated Quum Hebraeorum malitia, decreeing that the Talmud should be burnt along with cabalistic works and commentaries, which gave the owners of such works 10 days to turn them over to the Universal Inquisition in Rome and subsequently two months to hand them over to local inquisitors.

Notes

1593 in law
1593 works
Early Modern Christian anti-Judaism
Papal States
Christianity and law in the 16th century
16th-century papal bulls
Documents of Pope Clement VIII
1593 in Christianity

External Links
Caeca et Obdurata, page 23